Hideo (ひでお) is a masculine Japanese given name. Notable people with the name include:

 Hideo Den (田 英夫, 1923–2009), Japanese politician and news presenter
 Hideo Fujimoto (藤本 英雄, 1918–1997), Japanese baseball player
 Hideo Fukui (福井 英郎, born 1977), Japanese athlete who competes in triathlon
 Hideo Fukuyama (福山 英朗, born 1955), Japanese NASCAR driver
 Hideo Gosha (五社 英雄, 1929–1992), Japanese film director
 Hideo Hagiwara (萩原 英雄, 1913–2007), Japanese artist
, Japanese marathon runner
 Hideo Hashimoto (橋本 英郎, born 1979), Japanese footballer
 Hideo Higashikokubaru (東国原 英夫, born 1957), Japanese comedian, best known for his role in Takeshi's Castle and the current governor of Miyazaki Prefecture
 Hideo Hiraoka (平岡 秀夫, born 1954), Japanese politician
, Japanese sprinter and baseball player
 Hideo Ishikawa (石川 英郎, born 1969), Japanese voice actor
 Hideo Itokawa (糸川 英夫, 1912–1999), Japanese aerospace engineer
 Hideo Iwakuro (岩畔 豪雄, 1897–1970), World War II Imperial Japanese Army general
 Hideo Jinpu (神風 英男, born 1961), Japanese politician
 Hideo Kanaya (金谷 秀夫, born 1945), former Grand Prix motorcyclist
, Japanese basketball player
, Japanese rugby union player 
 Hideo Kanze (観世 栄夫, 1927–2007), Japanese actor
, Japanese writer
, Japanese sprint canoeist
 Hideo Kojima (小島 秀夫, born 1963), Japanese video game director
 Hideo Levy (リービ 英雄, born 1950), American-born Japanese language author
 Hideo Mizumori (水森 英夫), Japanese singer
, Japanese weightlifter
 Hideo Murai (村井 秀夫, 1958-1995), Japanese scientist
 Hideo Murata (村田英雄, 1929–2002), Japanese rōkyoku and enka singer
 Hideo Muraoka (村田英雄, 1929–2002), Brazilian-Japanese model
 Hideo Murota (室田 日出男, 1937–2002), Japanese actor
 Hideo Nagata (長田秀雄, 1885–1949), Japanese poet and playwright
 Hideo Nakata (中田 秀夫), Japanese film director
, American artist
 Hideo Nomo (野茂 英雄), Japanese baseball player
 Hideo Ochi (越智秀男, born 1940), Japanese Karate master
, Japanese rower
 Hideo Ogata (尾形英夫, 1934–2007), Japanese anime film producer
 Hideo Oguma (小熊秀雄, 1901–1940), Japanese author
 Hideo Ohba (大庭 英雄, 1910–1986), Japanese martial artist
, Japanese rower
 Hideo Ōshima (大島 秀夫, born 1980), Japanese football player
 Hideo Otake (大竹 英雄, born 1942), Japanese Go player
 Hideo Sakaki (榊 英雄, born 1970), Japanese actor
 Hideo Sakamaki, president of Nomura Securities between 1991–1997
, Japanese ice hockey player
 Hideo Sasaki (1919–2000), American landscape architect
, Japanese sport wrestler
 Hideo Seaver, American voice actor
, Japanese engineer
, Japanese ice hockey player
 Hideo Tanaka (disambiguation), several people
, Japanese cross-country skier
 Hideo Tokoro (born 1977), Japanese martial artist
, Japanese ice hockey player
 Hideo Usui (born 1939) (臼井 日出男), Japanese politician

 Hideo Watanabe (渡辺 秀央, born 1934), Japanese politician
, Japanese jazz musician
 Hideo Yamamoto (山本 英夫, born 1968), Japanese manga artist
 Hideo Yoritaka (頼高 英雄, born 1963), Japanese politician
 Hideo Yoshimura (1922-1995), better known as Pops Yoshimura, Japanese motorcycle tuner and factory Suzuki team owner
 Hideo Yoshino (吉野 秀雄, 1902–1967), Japanese tanka poet
 Hideo Yoshizawa (吉沢 秀雄), Japanese video game developer and director
, Japanese footballer and manager

Fictional characters
 Hideo Kuze, character from the anime Ghost in the Shell: S.A.C. 2nd GIG
 Hideo Minagawa, character from the anime Initial D Fifth Stage

See also
 6345 Hideo, a main-belt asteroid

Japanese masculine given names